Greatest Hits 1995–2005 is the first greatest hits compilation by Canadian country music singer Jason McCoy.

Track listing

 "Born Again in Dixieland" (Jason McCoy, Odie Blackmon) – 3:25
 "This Used to Be Our Town" (Denny Carr, McCoy, Chris Lindsey) – 3:46
 "She Ain't Missin' Missin' Me" (McCoy, Blackmon) – 2:46
 "Still" (McCoy, George Ducas) – 4:07
 "I Feel a Sin Comin' On" (McCoy, Carr) – 2:35
 "Kind of Like It's Love" (Jim Lauderdale, John Leventhal) – 3:00
 "Fix Anything" (McCoy, Carr) – 4:08
 "I'm Not Running Anymore" (McCoy, Carr) – 3:54
 "Ten Million Teardrops" (McCoy, Tim Taylor) – 3:14
 "Learning a Lot About Love" (Terrine Barnes, McCoy) – 3:35
 "A Little Bit of You" (Craig Wiseman, McCoy, Sonny Burgess) – 2:56
 "Candle" (McCoy, Barnes) – 3:07
 "Heaven Help Her Heart" (McCoy, Blackmon) – 3:13
 "Bury My Heart" (Tia Sillers, Mark Selby, Sean Michaels) – 2:58
 "I Lie" (McCoy) – 4:15
 "I'm Gonna Make Her Mine" (McCoy, Lindsey) – 3:17

External links
 amazon.ca

Jason McCoy albums
2005 greatest hits albums
Open Road Recordings compilation albums